Mbeere North Constituency is an electoral constituency in Embu County, Kenya. It was formerly known as Siakago Constituency, one of two constituencies of the former Mbeere District. It has five wards, all of which elected councillors for the Mbeere County Council.

The constituency was established for the 1988 elections from the bigger Embu East Constituency, which was divided to Runyenjes and Siakago constituencies.

Silvester Mate, the first Siakago MP, was the last Embu East MP winning the seat in 1983.

Siakago town, the former district capital, is located within Nthawa location in this constituency.
The current governor for Embu town is cesily mbarire

Members of Parliament

Locations and wards

References

External links 
Siakago Constituency

Constituencies in Eastern Province (Kenya)
1988 establishments in Kenya
Constituencies established in 1988
Constituencies in Embu County